Art Academy: Lessons for Everyone!, entitled New Art Academy in Europe and Australia is a 2012 video game for the Nintendo 3DS. It is a sequel to Art Academy for the Nintendo DS. This game is the first in the series to include DLC.

Gameplay 

Guided by the bearded artist Vince, the player completes tutorials in basic artistic composition.  The skills are intended to be transferable to art practice outside the game. Vince instructs in portraiture, landscapes, still life, and architecture. The basic lessons include how to block with color and add detail, how to add light and shade to line drawings, and how to mix paint and create atmosphere. Advanced lessons include expansions on these ideas with shorter exposition from Vince.

Additions to its predecessor include pencil crayons and pastels. The game has a new user interface, a higher resolution, and lets players mix media more easily.

Reception

The critical reception has been favorable upon the release, scoring 81/100 on the aggregator site Metacritic, based on reviews of 14 critics.

IGN Chris Schilling found Art Academy to be better and more complete than its predecessor but still capable of more. He wrote that Colors 3D offered more while costing less—he lamented the absence of a 3D painting feature, in particular. Art Academy, Schilling felt, could serve as an educational preparation for games like Colors. He praised the usefulness of the game's classes and their flourishes of art history, and found that the larger Nintendo 3DS XL screen let the player add more detail.

Sequel
On June 11, 2013, a sequel was announced for the Wii U in the Nintendo Direct presentation for E3 2013.

References

External links

2012 video games
Drawing video games
Headstrong Games
Art Academy
Nintendo 3DS eShop games
Nintendo 3DS games
Nintendo 3DS-only games
Nintendo games
Nintendo Network games
Video games developed in the United Kingdom
Video games scored by James Hannigan
Video games produced by Kensuke Tanabe
Single-player video games